Coupling Collection (カップリングコレクション) is FLOW's first B-Side best album. The album comes into two editions: regular and limited. The limited edition includes a bonus DVD and a BOX Special Package. It reached #25 on the Oricon charts  and charted for 4 weeks. *

Track listing

Bonus DVD Track listing

References

Flow (band) albums
Ki/oon Records albums
2009 compilation albums